The Endkopf is a mountain in the Ötztal Alps in South Tyrol, Italy.

References 
Walter Klier: Alpenvereinsführer Ötztaler Alpen. Bergverlag Rudolf Rother, Munich, 2006,

External links 

Mountains of the Alps
Mountains of South Tyrol
Ötztal Alps